Jerzy Zdzisław Kulej (19 October 1940 – 13 July 2012) was a Polish boxer, politician and sports commentator. He was a double Olympic and World Champion.

Life and career
He was born in 1940 in Częstochowa, Poland. He started his boxing career in 1955 in the Start Częstochowa club. In 1958, he joined Poland's national team coached by Feliks Stamm. At the 1964 Summer Olympics, he won a gold medal in the light welterweight division (<63.5 kg) defeating Yevgeny Frolov.
In 1968, he defended his title in a close match against a Cuban boxer Enrique Regüeiferos becoming the only Polish boxer to ever win two Olympic gold medals.
He also twice won a gold medal at the European Amateur Championships in 1963 and 1965, and won a silver medal in 1967.
He had a record of 317 wins, 6 draws and 25 losses.

In 1976, he made an appearance in a movie Przepraszam, czy tu biją? directed by Marek Piwowski.  In 1995, he received the Aleksander Reksza Boxing Award.

In 1998, he was awarded the Commander's Cross of the Order of Polonia Restituta by President Aleksander Kwaśniewski for his "outstanding contributions to the Olympic movement, the development and popularization of physical culture as well as sporting achievements".

In his later years, he became a politician representing various parties over the time. In 2001, as a member of Democratic Left Alliance for electoral district of Warsaw he became a member of the Polish parliament (the Sejm) and server to 2005.
He was a boxing commentator for Polish TV station Polsat Sport.

Death
In December 2011, he suffered a massive heart attack. While in recovery, he learned that he suffered from an eye melanoma that was, in the end, the direct cause of his death in Warsaw on 13 July 2012 at the age of 71. He was buried on 20 July at the Powązki Military Cemetery in Warsaw.

Olympic results
1964 - Tokyo
Round of 64 – bye
Round of 32 – Defeated Roberto Amaya (Argentina) by decision, 5–0
Round of 16 – Defeated Richard McTaggart (Great Britain) by decision, 4–1
Quarterfinal – Defeated Iosif Mihalic (Romania) by decision, 4–1
Semifinal – Defeated Eddie Blay (Ghana) by decision, 5–0
Final – Defeated Yevgeny Frolov (Soviet Union) by decision, 5–0

1968 - Mexico City
Round of 64 – bye
Round of 32 – Defeated János Kajdi (Hungary) by decision, 3–2
Round of 16 – Defeated Giambattista Capretti (Italy) by decision, 4–1
Quarterfinals – Defeated Peter Tiepold (East Germany) by decision, 3–2
Semifinals – Defeated Arto Nilsson (Finland) by decision, 5–0
Final – Defeated Enrique Requeiferos (Cuba) by decision, 3–2

See also
List of Poles
Sport in Poland
Poland at the Olympics

References

External links

1940 births
2012 deaths
Polish male boxers
Boxers at the 1964 Summer Olympics
Boxers at the 1968 Summer Olympics
Olympic boxers of Poland
Medalists at the 1968 Summer Olympics
Medalists at the 1964 Summer Olympics
Olympic medalists in boxing
Olympic gold medalists for Poland
Democratic Left Alliance politicians
Members of the Polish Sejm 2001–2005
Sportspeople from Częstochowa
Light-welterweight boxers
20th-century Polish people
21st-century Polish people